George "Harry" Kaye (19 April 1919 – 1992) was an English footballer who played as a defender. He played for Bradford City as a wartime guest during WW2, before joining Liverpool. He only played a couple of games for Liverpool before moving to Swindon Town.

External links
 LFC History profile
 

1919 births
1992 deaths
English footballers
Association football midfielders
Liverpool F.C. players
Swindon Town F.C. players
English Football League players